The Lanitz Escapade Two is a German ultralight aircraft, derived from the Just Escapade, that was produced by Lanitz Aviation of Leipzig. When it was available the aircraft was supplied complete  and ready-to-fly.

By March 2018 the aircraft was no longer advertised on the company website and production has likely ended.

Design and development
The aircraft was designed to comply with the Fédération Aéronautique Internationale microlight rules. It features a strut-braced high-wing, a two-seats-in-side-by-side configuration enclosed cockpit, convertible fixed tricycle landing gear and conventional landing gear and a single engine in tractor configuration.

The Escapade Two fuselage is made from powder coated welded steel tubing, with its wing made with an aluminium spar and spruce ribs. The aircraft is covered with Oratex aircraft fabric. The standard engine available is the  ULPower UL260i four-stroke powerplant. The landing gear can be changed from nose wheel to tail wheel configuration in about two hours.

The Escapade Two is certified to United Kingdom BCAR Section "S" and German microlight standards.

Specifications (Escapade Two)

References

External links

2000s German ultralight aircraft
Homebuilt aircraft
Single-engined tractor aircraft